Seriatopora stellata is a species of colonial stony coral in the family Pocilloporidae. It is native to the western Indo-Pacific region, its range extending from the central Indian Ocean to the central Indo-Pacific, northwestern Australia, Indonesia, Japan, the south China Sea and the oceanic island groups in the West Pacific. It is a widespread but uncommon species and the International Union for Conservation of Nature has assessed its conservation status as being "near threatened".

References

External links
 

Pocilloporidae
Animals described in 1886